The San Antonio Times is a private Texas-based newspaper. Since its introduction in 1994 (originally headed under the San Antonio Pacific-News), the publication has expanded from less than 50 readers to several thousands.

The San Antonio Times is best known for its inclusive approach to news reporting, which integrates multiple viewpoints in its coverage of news and events, as well as its sparing use of politics.
Newspapers published in Texas
Mass media in San Antonio